Cyphononyx optimus is a species of spider wasps in the family Pompilidae.

Description
Body is completely black, with black antennae. Wings are black, too, with bluish reflections. Legs are yellowish.

Females of this genus hunt and paralyse large spiders, mainly Palystes species.

Distribution and habitat
This species can be found in subtropical forests, savanna, and bushveld of Ethiopia, Kenya, Uganda, South Africa, and Zimbabwe.

References

Picker, M., Griffiths, C & Weaving, A. 2002. Field Guide to Insects of South Africa. Struik Publishers, Cape Town

Insects described in 1855
Pepsinae